Anita Lizzie Grunder is geologist known for her research on volcanic rocks and defining changes in volcanism over geologic eras. She is an elected fellow of the Geological Society of America.

Education and career 
Grunder has an A.B. in paleontology from the University of California, Berkeley (1977), and subsequently worked as a field assistant at UC Berkeley, the University of California, Los Angeles, Scripps Institution of Oceanography, and the United States Geological Survey. She went to Stanford University for graduate school where she described her position as an "adventure" in a 1983 magazine article. She graduated in 1986 with a thesis project working on the geology of the southern Andes. Grunder moved to Oregon in 1986, ultimately becoming a professor and an associate dean. As of 2019, Grunder is professor emeritus at Oregon State.

Research 
Grunder is a field geologist who has worked on volcanoes and volcanic rocks in a variety of locations including Nevada, Oregon, and the Aucanquilcha region in Chile.  Her early research was on the volcanic rocks and hydrothermal system at Calabozos crater in the Chilean Andes. She uses oxygen-18 isotopes in different types of rocks to reveal changes in magmatic activity over millions of years. In 2005, Grunder co-edited a collection of articles on welding processes in volcanic systems, and contributed an article on welded pyroclastic deposits from Oregon. In Hawaii, she worked on the sulfur dioxide released by the Kilauea volcano and collaborated with a graduate student working in public health, Bernadette Longo, to reveal increased health issues for people living downwind of the volcano. In 2020 she examined the geology of the volcanic material in the area surrounding Steens Mountain in southeastern Oregon. One of her students described her skills at explaining volcanic processes and noted that she is adept at making geology interesting to a range of people, both inside and outside academia.

Selected publications

Awards and honors 
In 2009, Grunder was named the Association for Women Geoscientists' Outstanding Educator. Her paper on volcanism and gold deposits in hydrothermal material at Yanacocha, Peru won the 2010 Brian J. Skinner award from Society of Economic Geologists. She is also an elected fellow of the Geological Society of America.

Personal life 
During a 2009 interview, Grunder noted her first job involved welding band saw blades because her lack of typing skills kept her from receiving a spot as a secretary. She is married to John Dilles, a geosciences professor in Oregon and has three children, and in 1989 she discussed a job sharing arrangement she and her husband made upon moving to Oregon State. Grunder volunteers in Oregon with the Independent Community Club, and one of their activities is the restoration of an old schoolhouse in Albany, Oregon that was added to the National Register of Historic Places in 2013. in 2008, she led the effort to found the Muddy Creek Charter School in Oregon. Her outside sculpture piece "Excess Baggage" developed collectively by Warren Lisser, Susie Lisser and Grunder was presented at Burning Man in 2013.

References 

Fellows of the Geological Society of America
University of California, Berkeley alumni
Stanford University alumni
Oregon State University faculty
Women geologists
Volcanologists
Living people
Year of birth missing (living people)